Minuscule 170 (in the Gregory-Aland numbering), ε 307 (Soden), is a Greek minuscule manuscript of the New Testament, on parchment. Palaeographically it has been assigned to the 13th century. It has marginalia.

Description 

The codex contains the text of the four Gospels on 277 parchment leaves (size ). The text is written in one column per page, in 23 lines per page. The text of Luke 16:7 and the most of John was written by a later hand from the 15th century.

There is also a division according to the smaller Ammonian Sections, with references to the Eusebian Canons (written below Ammonian Section numbers).

The Synaxarion and Menologion were added by later hand.

Text 
The Greek text of the codex is a representative of the Byzantine text-type. Aland placed it in Category V.

Hermann von Soden classified it to the textual family Kr. According to the Claremont Profile Method it belongs to the textual family Kr in Luke 1 and Luke 20. In Luke 10 no profile was made. It belongs to subgroup 35.

History 

Currently the manuscript is dated to the 13th century.

It was examined by Bianchini, Birch (about 1782), and Scholz. C. R. Gregory saw it in 1886.

It is currently housed at the Biblioteca Vallicelliana (C. 61), at Rome.

See also 

 List of New Testament minuscules
 Biblical manuscript
 Textual criticism

References

Further reading 

 

Greek New Testament minuscules
13th-century biblical manuscripts